Marianna Tax Choldin is Mortenson Distinguished Professor Emerita, University of Illinois at Urbana-Champaign. She was on the faculty during 1969-2002. Her research interests include censorship in Russia, the Soviet Union, and the post-Communist states.

She received he bachelor's (1962) and Ph.D. (1979) from the University of Chicago.

She was the founding director of the Mortenson Center for International Library Programs from 1991 until her retirement in 2002.  In 1995 she was served as  President of the American Association for the Advancement of Slavic Studies. From 1997 to 2000 she chaired the library program of the Soros Foundation.

Her interests in the study of censorship originated in an incident with the customs officer who confiscated books and magazines from passengers entering the Soviet Union.

Books
2016: Garden of Broken Statues: Exploring Censorship in Russia, 
1985: A Fence Around the Empire: Russian Censorship of Western Ideas Under the Tsars

Awards
2011: public service award from the University of Chicago
2011: Robert B. Downs Intellectual Freedom Award from the Graduate School of Library and Information Science at the University of Illinois at Urbana-Champaign
2011: Alumni Medal form the UChicago Alumni Association 
2005: John Ames Humphry/OCLC/Forest Press Award from the  American Library Association's International Relations Committee, for significant contributions to international librarianship
2001: She was the first recipient of the University of Illinois' Distinguished Faculty Award for International Achievement
2000: Gold Medal of Pushkin, Russia, for "extraordinary contributions in the sphere of Russian culture and education"

Personal
Her grandmother was Jewish coming from Ukraine, Russian Empire. Her father was professor of anthropology at the University of Chicago.

References

External links
Marianna's Russian adventures - Garden of Broken Statues author Marianna Tax Choldin in conversation with Scott Shoger

Year of birth missing (living people)
Living people
University of Illinois Urbana-Champaign faculty
University of Chicago alumni
American people of Russian-Jewish descent 
American librarians
American women librarians
21st-century American women